South Korean archers have been dominant in modern competitive archery, particularly in the Olympic recurve discipline, since the 1980s, thanks to a mixture of public interest, domestic competition, coaching for children, innovative coaching methods, significant funding and state-of-the-art facilities. This is a partial list and timeline of archers from South Korea who have represented their country in international competitions.

List

Recurve

Compound

Timeline

The following tables show which archers were selected to represent South Korea at each year's major competition, the Olympic Games, Asian Games and World Archery Championships, and medals won at each event.

Key
 Part of South Korean representation at competition
 Not part of South Korean representation at competition
 Competition not held
 Gold medal 
 Silver medal 
 Bronze medal 
I Individual
T Team
X Mixed Team

1970-1979

Recurve

1980-1989

Recurve

1990-1999

Recurve

2000-2009

Recurve

2010-2019

Recurve

See also
Korean archery
Archery
List of people of Korean descent

References

 
Archers
Korean